Australian Freedom from Hunger Campaign (AFFHC) was a charity in Australia from 1961 to 1992.

It merged with Community Aid Abroad in 1992.

History
The first AFFHC meeting was held following the launch in 1960 of the United Nations Food and Agriculture Organization's five-year campaign, Freedom from Hunger.

AFFHC membership was initially open to organisations rather than individuals, and these included unions and community interest groups. AFFHC grew to become a national organisation in 1964, and adopted its first constitution in 1965.

In 1981, AFFHC adopted a new constitution, and in the mid-1980s, its national office moved from Canberra (where it had been since 1979) to Sydney. In 1992, AFFHC merged with Community Aid Abroad.

Activities
Projects undertaken by AFFHC have included appeals for India (1966), East Timor (1975), Kampuchea (1981), and famine relief appeals for Ethiopia, Tigray, and Eritrea (1985).

In 1972, AFFHC began funding Aboriginal organisations including the Aboriginal Advancement Association and the Aboriginal Medical Service. The early 1980s saw AFFHC increase its support for indigenous issues and programs, with a grant to the Yipirinya School in the Northern Territory, a campaign calling on the Queensland Government to repeal the Aborigines and Torres Straits Islanders Act of 1971 and support for Aboriginal land councils.

Notes

References
National Library of Australia [Website] http://nla.gov.au/nla.ms-ms4529 (7 Dec 2005)

External links
Oxfam Australia https://web.archive.org/web/20051201223039/http://www.oxfam.org.au/about/longhistory.html

Development charities based in Australia
Hunger relief organizations